Philippe Pradal (born 1 February 1963) is a French politician. He was first deputy mayor of Nice from 2013 to 2016. He served as Mayor of Nice from 2016 to 2017. He supported Nicolas Sarkozy for The Republicans presidential primary in 2016. He received the Knights of the Legion of Honor in July 2017.  He is currently a member of the Horizons party.

Biography
Philippe Pradal was born in Nice, France in 1963. He has one daughter. He was in e position on the list of outgoing mayor in 2014. He appeared in 37th position on the list of Christian Estrosi in 2008.

References 

1963 births
Living people
People from Nice
Rally for the Republic politicians
Union for a Popular Movement politicians
The Republicans (France) politicians
Horizons politicians
Deputies of the 16th National Assembly of the French Fifth Republic
Mayors of Nice
Chevaliers of the Légion d'honneur